Middelburg is a hamlet in the Dutch province of South Holland. It is located about 2 km east of Waddinxveen, in the former municipality of Reeuwijk.

The statistical area "Middelburg", which also includes parts of the surrounding countryside, has a population of around 260.

Middelburg was a separate municipality from 1817 to 1855, when it became part of Reeuwijk.

References

Bodegraven-Reeuwijk
Populated places in South Holland
Former municipalities of South Holland